Kirstie Louise Alley (January 12, 1951 – December 5, 2022) was an American actress. Her breakout role was as Rebecca Howe in the NBC sitcom Cheers (1987–1993), for which she received an Emmy Award and a Golden Globe in 1991. From 1997 to 2000, she starred as the lead in the sitcom Veronica's Closet, earning additional Emmy and Golden Globe nominations. On film, she was perhaps best known for her role as Mollie Jensen in Look Who's Talking (1989) and its two sequels, Look Who's Talking Too (1990) and Look Who's Talking Now (1993).

Throughout the 1980s and 1990s, Alley appeared in various films, including Star Trek II: The Wrath of Khan (1982), Summer School (1987), Shoot to Kill (1988), Madhouse (1990), Sibling Rivalry (1990), Village of the Damned (1995), It Takes Two (1995), Deconstructing Harry (1997), For Richer or Poorer (1997), and Drop Dead Gorgeous (1999).

Alley won her second Emmy Award in 1994 for the television film David's Mother. In 1997, Alley received another Emmy nomination for her work in the crime drama series The Last Don. In 2005, she played a fictionalized version of herself on Showtime's Fat Actress, something she would also do on episodes of King of Queens and Hot in Cleveland, as well as in Syrup (2013). In 2013, Alley returned to acting with the title role on the sitcom Kirstie. In 2016, she appeared on the Fox comedy horror series Scream Queens.

She also appeared in reality television including Kirstie Alley's Big Life (2010) and served as a contestant on the 12th season of Dancing with the Stars (2011–2012), where she finished in second place, behind Hines Ward, and the 22nd series of the British reality show Celebrity Big Brother (2018), in which she finished as runner-up. In early 2022, she appeared on The Masked Singer.

Early life
Alley was born in Wichita, Kansas, to Robert Deal Alley, who owned a lumber company, and Lillian Alley. She had two siblings, Colette and Craig. Alley attended Wichita Southeast High School, graduating in 1969. She attended college at Kansas State University, dropping out after her sophomore year. After moving to Los Angeles to pursue Scientology and work as an interior designer, Alley appeared as a contestant on the game show Match Game in 1979. Winning both her games, she went on to win $500 in her first Super Match and $5,500 in her second. She also appeared on the game show Password Plus in 1980. On both shows, she described her profession as interior designer. In 1981, an automobile accident involving a drunk driver killed her mother and left her father seriously injured.

Career
Alley made her film debut in 1982 in Star Trek II: The Wrath of Khan in the role of the Vulcan Starfleet officer Lieutenant Saavik. The Saavik character became very popular with Star Trek fans, but Alley chose not to reprise the role in the next two film sequels. Actress Robin Curtis succeeded her in the role. She was also a regular on the ABC television series Masquerade from 1983 to 1984. In the years following, she starred in a number of smaller films, including One More Chance, Blind Date and Runaway. In 1985, she starred in the ABC miniseries North and South, and also portrayed feminist icon Gloria Steinem in the television movie A Bunny's Tale. In 1987, Alley starred alongside Mark Harmon in the comedy film Summer School. The film was a box office success, grossing over $35 million in the United States.

Later in 1987, Alley joined the cast of NBC sitcom Cheers, replacing Shelley Long. It became her breakout hit role and she remained with the show for six years until its eleventh and final season. In 1989, Alley starred with John Travolta in Look Who's Talking. The film grossed over $295 million worldwide. They then went on to make two other films centered on the same theme, Look Who's Talking Too and Look Who's Talking Now. After two Emmy Award nominations for her work on Cheers, in 1988 and 1990, she won the Emmy on her third nomination, in 1991.

Alley earned her second Emmy for the 1994 television film David's Mother. For her contributions to the film industry, Alley received a motion pictures star on the Hollywood Walk of Fame at 7000 Hollywood Boulevard in 1995.

From 1997 to 2000, Alley played the title character in the NBC sitcom Veronica's Closet, as well as serving as executive producer on the show. She served as the spokesperson for Pier 1 Imports from 2000 to 2004, and for Jenny Craig from 2004 to 2007.

TV Land aired a sitcom that centered on Alley as a Broadway star and a new parent. It was titled Kirstie, and reunited her with former Cheers co-star Rhea Perlman and Seinfeld star Michael Richards. The series premiered on December 4, 2013, and ran for one season before it was canceled, five months after ending its freshman run.

She was partnered with Maksim Chmerkovskiy on the 15th season of Dancing with the Stars, where she finished in second place. In 2015 Alley was cast in Time Crashers, a reality history program on Channel 4. In 2022, Alley competed in season seven of The Masked Singer as "Baby Mammoth" of Team Cuddly.

Personal life
Alley was married from 1971 to 1977 to high-school sweetheart Bob Alley, who coincidentally had the same name as her father. Alley married actor Parker Stevenson on December 22, 1983. After a miscarriage, the couple adopted their first child, a son, in October 1992, and in 1995, they adopted their second child, a girl. The marriage ended in 1997. In 2016, Alley became a grandmother through her son.

In 1988 and 2000 respectively, Alley purchased estates in Jacksonville, Oregon and Clearwater, Florida, retaining ownership of both properties until her death in 2022. From 1991 to 2020, Alley also resided on Islesboro Island, Maine. She once owned the Mitchell Cottage, formerly the Islesboro Inn, with her then husband.

Body image 
On The Dr. Oz Show on September 17, 2012, Alley said she started gaining weight in late 2003, and that she had been a compulsive eater all her life without gaining weight, only noticing the change after she reached early menopause in 1992.

In March 2010, after gossip blogger Roger Friedman alleged a link between her Organic Liaison weight-loss system and the Church of Scientology, Alley wrote: "Please Google Mr. Roger Friedman. He is spreading lies about me and my new business. You will see his history & why Fox fired him. Going to have Mr. Attorney call Mr. Friedman's Attorney tomorrow ... Mr. Friedman is treading on thin LIBELOUS ice with my company." In September 2011, Alley announced she had lost  using weight loss products from Organic Liaison. In 2012, she faced a class-action lawsuit alleging false advertising; the suit claimed that her weight loss was the result of exercise, including training for the TV show Dancing with the Stars, not Organic Liaison products. She settled the suit in 2013, agreeing to remove the term "Proven Products" from packaging, issue a disclaimer on the brand's website that it is a "calorie-based weight-loss product", and pay a $130,000 settlement.

In April 2014, she resumed a role as a spokesperson with Jenny Craig; the Organic Liaison product line was acquired by Jenny Craig's parent company, and subsequently integrated into Jenny Craig's product line. In January 2015, Alley said that, since starting the Jenny Craig weight-loss program again, she had lost .

Scientology 
Alley was raised as a Methodist; she became a member of the Church of Scientology in 1979. She said that until she became a Scientologist she had been addicted to cocaine but then went through Narconon, a Scientology-affiliated drug treatment program, to end her addiction. By 2007, she had attained the level of OT VII (Operating Thetan Level 7), and by 2018, she was New OT VIII. Alley said: "Scientology made me a lot stronger and tougher ... It's made me more honest and more willing to take responsibility for other people." Alley gave $5 million to the church in 2007.

As a member of the Church of Scientology, Alley chose not to, though was never asked to, reprise her role as Rebecca Howe on any episode of Frasier, because the series was centered on the field of medical psychiatrists; she was the only former Cheers regular not to do so.

Politics
Alley stated that in past presidential elections, she had backed both Democratic and Republican nominees, but decided not to vote in 1988 and 2004. In August 2015, Alley tweeted that she would not support Hillary Clinton, the Democratic nominee, during the 2016 presidential election, and on April 8, 2016, she tweeted her support for Republicans Donald Trump and Rudy Giuliani. On October 8, 2016, Alley retracted her endorsement of Trump, tweeting, "I hate this election and I'm officially no longer endorsing either candidate."

In October 2020, she stated she had indeed voted for Trump in 2016 and intended to vote for him again in 2020 because "he's NOT a politician." She also endorsed Republican John James in the 2020 United States Senate election in Michigan.

Death
Alley died from stage 4 colon cancer, discovered in May 2022 after a doctor’s visit for a sore back. Despite chemotherapy treatments at the Moffitt Cancer Center in Tampa, Florida, she died at her home in Clearwater on December 5, 2022, at the age of 71.

Her ex-husband Parker Stevenson, her two children, Look Who's Talking co-star John Travolta, and other celebrities posted their condolences on social media. Her Cheers co-stars Ted Danson, Kelsey Grammer, and Rhea Perlman also released statements memorializing her.

Filmography

Film

Television

Awards and nominations 
Alley's work has been honored by multiple associations throughout her career. For her role in the sitcom Cheers, she earned four Golden Globe Award nominations winning one for Best Actress – Television Series Musical or Comedy in 1991, and five Primetime Emmy Award nominations winning one for Outstanding Lead Actress in a Comedy Series in 1991.

On November 10, 1995, Alley was given a star on the Hollywood Walk of Fame for her contributions to motion pictures.

See also 
 List of stars on the Hollywood Walk of Fame

References

External links

 
 

1951 births
2022 deaths
20th-century American actresses
21st-century American actresses
Actors from Wichita, Kansas
Actresses from Kansas
American film actresses
American former Protestants
American Scientologists
American television actresses
Best Musical or Comedy Actress Golden Globe (television) winners
California Republicans
Contestants on American game shows
Former Methodists
Kansas State University alumni
Outstanding Performance by a Lead Actress in a Comedy Series Primetime Emmy Award winners
Outstanding Performance by a Lead Actress in a Miniseries or Movie Primetime Emmy Award winners
People from Islesboro, Maine
Wichita Southeast High School alumni
Deaths from colorectal cancer
Deaths from cancer in Florida